Evelyn Sybil Mary Eaton (22 December 1902 – 17 July 1983) was a Canadian novelist, short-story writer, poet and academic known for her early novels set in New France, and later writings which explored spirituality.

Life account
Born in Montreux, Switzerland, Eaton was the daughter of Canadians Lieutenant-Colonel Daniel Isaac Vernon Eaton, an army officer from Nova Scotia, and Myra Fitzrandolph of New Brunswick. Eaton was the younger of two daughters.  Lt.-Col. Eaton was killed in 1917, while directing the artillery assault at the battle of Vimy Ridge in France, when Evelyn Eaton was just 14. Evelyn's older sister, Helen Moira, would marry Sir John Lindsay Dashwood of the Dashwood Baronets.

Educated at the Netherwood School in Rothesay, New Brunswick, Heathfield School in Ascot, England, and at the Sorbonne in Paris, Eaton rejected many of the social conventions of her time and class, giving birth out of wedlock to a daughter while at the Sorbonne.  She wrote poetry from an early age, publishing the first, "The Interpreter", in 1923.  Two novels written in 1938 and 1939 received little notice, but in 1940, the publication of Quietly My Captain Waits, a novel set in Acadia (now Nova Scotia) in the early days of French settlement (New France), brought her commercial success.  She became an American citizen in 1945.  A series of novels set in New France followed, as did a teaching appointment at Columbia University from 1949–1951, a Visiting Lecturership at Sweet Briar College, Virginia from 1951–1960, and a position as Writer in Residence with the Huntingdon Hartford Foundation in 1960 and 1962.

Eaton's 1965 novel The King Is A Witch is a historical novel about King Edward III. The King Is A Witch depicts Edward and some of his retinue as secret followers of a pre-Christian "Old Faith". The novel was influenced by the ideas of James George Frazer and Margaret Murray.

As described in 1974 autobiography, The Trees and Fields Went the Other Way Eaton had always felt that she had some Native American or First Nations heritage, and in the 1950s she began to read books about Native American religions.  A series of short stories published in The New Yorker, four more novels, a volume of poetry, and a Ballet-oratorio would grow out of Eaton's continuing promotion of what she believed were First Nations' spiritual practices.

In 1966, the Evelyn Sybil Mary Eaton Collection, a repository for her books, manuscripts, and personal papers, was established in the Mugar Memorial Library at Boston University.

Partial bibliography
1923:The Interpreter 
1925:The Encircling Mist 
1928:Hours of Isis 
1938:Summer Dust 
1938:Pray to the Earth
1940:Quietly My Captain Waits 
1942:Restless are the Sails
1943:Birds before Dawn  
1943:The Sea is So Wide  
1945:In What Torn Ship 
1946:Journey to a War  
1946:The Heart in Pilgrimage
1946:Every Month was May
1949:The North Star is Nearer 
1950:Give Me Your Golden Hand  
1952:By Just Exchange
1954:Flight 
1955:The Small Hour 
1959:I Saw My Mortal Sight  
1965:The King is a Witch 
1967:The Progression a Ballet-oratorio 
1969:Go ask the River 
1971:Love is Recognition 
1974:The Trees and Fields Went the Other Way 
1974:Snowy Earth Comes Gliding 
1978:I Send a Voice 
1982:The Shaman and the Medicine Wheel 
1988:Joy Before Night, the Last Years of Evelyn Eaton A biography of Evelyn Eaton, written by her daughter Terry Eaton

See also

List of Canadian writers
List of American writers

References

1902 births
1983 deaths
20th-century Canadian novelists
20th-century Canadian poets
Canadian historical novelists
Canadian women poets
Canadian women short story writers
Canadian women novelists
University of Paris alumni
Columbia University faculty
Sweet Briar College faculty
Writers from Nova Scotia
Canadian expatriates in the United Kingdom
Canadian expatriates in the United States
Canadian expatriates in Switzerland
20th-century Canadian women writers
People from Montreux
20th-century Canadian short story writers
Women historical novelists
Writers of historical fiction set in the Middle Ages
Canadian expatriates in France